The 1987 Castrol 500 was a race for Touring Cars complying with Appendix C of the National Competition Rules of the Confederation of Australian Motor Sport (commonly known as Group A Touring Cars). The event was staged on 13 September 1987 over 129 laps of the 3.9 km Sandown circuit in Victoria, Australia, a total distance of 503 km.

The race, the 22nd Sandown 500, was won by George Fury and Terry Shiel, driving a Nissan Skyline DR30 RS.

Summary

Qualifying
The race saw the Australian debut of the evolution Ford Sierra RS500. Although none of the four Sierras finished the race (two in fact did not start), the new  model proved it would be the car to beat at 1987 James Hardie 1000. Andrew Miedecke in his Oxo Supercubes Sierra (an Andy Rouse kit car) attained provisional pole position in qualifying with a time of 1:49.45 before his weekend ended when co-driver Don Smith rolled the car at the end of pit straight, just prior to the end of qualifying. Dick Johnson went even better in the Dulux Dozen runoff for pole with a time of 1:47.59, almost two seconds quicker than Miedecke's time earlier in the day. This time would remain the fastest ever Group A touring car time recorded on the 3.9 km long international circuit.

Peter Brock attracted pre-race criticism for his decision to have Channel 7 television commentator Neil Crompton as the second driver of the Mobil 1 team's Holden Commodore with accusations of it being nothing more than a PR exercise after the bad press the team had received in 1987 in the wake of Brock's split with Holden. With new Bridgestone tyres and an adjustable rear end developed by the team that allowed negative camber of the rear tyres transforming the handling of the Commodore, plus some extra engine development up to and following the Spa 24 Hours bringing power up to a respectable , Brock himself qualified fifth, only a couple of tenths behind Allan Grice's Les Small prepared Roadways VL Commodore and some 1.5 seconds faster than Larry Perkins in the older model VK. Both Grice and Perkins were running engines with approximately  more than the HDT cars.

Race
The 1987 Castrol 500 was won by the Peter Jackson Nissan Racing Skyline DR30 RS of George Fury and Terry Shiel. The win continued the Nissan team's winning streak at Sandown in 1986 and 1987 with the Skyline, having won the ATCC rounds at the circuit in both years as well as Fury and Glenn Seton having won the 1986 Castrol 500. They won by a lap from the V8 Holden VK Commodore of Larry Perkins and Denny Hulme with the New Zealand Nissan Skyline of Kent Baigent and Graeme Bowkett a further lap back in third place. Kiwis Kaigent and Bowkett continued to impress with their speed in the privateer Skyline, never falling out of the top five during the race except during pit stops. The NZ Skyline was engineered by Jim and Ross Stone who would later go on to work with both Andrew Miedecke and Dick Johnson Sierra's over the next few seasons before forming their own team Stone Brothers Racing. The car also featured a lot of technical input from the Peter Jackson team.

The Ford Sierra of pole sitter Dick Johnson suffered an engine failure in the race morning warmup which forced him and Gregg Hansford to move to the team's car. After starting from 14th on the grid, Johnson showed the speed of the new Sierra by storming to the front after just 7 laps, leaving the BMW's, Commodores and turbo Nissans in his wake on Sandown's long front and back straights. Johnson would go on to set a Group A lap record of 1:50.28 before the #18 car was retired with engine failure on lap 86.

The JPS Team BMW M3 of Jim Richards and Tony Longhurst held second place late in the race and Richards was contesting the lead with Fury on the now damp track due to light rain until the 2.3 L engine lost oil pressure on lap 118. Just five laps earlier, the Holden VL Commodore of Peter Brock had been holding a strong third place comfortably in front of Perkins until his front brakes suddenly gave out at the end of pit straight. Brock slid sideways into the sandtrap and was lucky not to roll the Commodore after the driver's side wheels dug into the sand.

The Up to 2000cc class was won by the Peter Jackson Nissan Gazelle of young gun Mark Skaife and part-time sports sedan racer Grant Jarrett from the Toyota Team Australia Corolla of Mike Quinn and John Faulkner and the Toyota Sprinter of Sydney veterans Bob Holden and Garry Willmington.

Television coverage
Australian broadcasters Channel Seven covered both the Saturday shootout and the entire race. A copy can be found online at: https://www.youtube.com/watch?v=m7T0WZGc7hA

Classes
Cars competed in three engine capacity classes:
 Class A: 3001 cc - 6000 cc
 Class B: 2001 cc - 3000 cc
 Class C: Up to 2000 cc

Results

Dulux Dozen

Race

Statistics
 Pole Position – #17 Dick Johnson - Ford Sierra RS500 – 1:47.59
 Fastest Lap – #18 Dick Johnson - Ford Sierra RS500 – 1:50.28 (new lap record)
 Race time of winning car - 4:10:28.06

See also
 1987 Australian Touring Car season

References

External links
 Group A Archives (including 1987 Castrol 500 images), www.groupc.org.au as archived at web.archive.org 
 1987 Castrol 500 - full race, www.youtube.com

Motorsport at Sandown
Castrol 500
Pre-Bathurst 500